Tempestt Bledsoe is an American actress.  She is best known for her childhood role as Vanessa Huxtable, the fourth child of Cliff and Clair Huxtable on the long-running NBC sitcom The Cosby Show (1984–92). In December 2010, it was announced that Bledsoe would be the host of Clean House on the Style Network, replacing long-time host Niecy Nash. From September 2012 to February 2013, she was one of the stars of the NBC TV sitcom Guys with Kids, portraying Marny.

Career
In 1984, Bledsoe was cast in the role of Vanessa Huxtable on the sitcom The Cosby Show. She was a regular until its final season in 1992. She also made a one-time appearance as Vanessa on A Different World. In 1986, Tempestt played the role of Grace Wheeler in season 15, episode 4 "(The Gift of Amazing Grace)", of the ABC Afterschool Special program. In 1989 she was a national spokesperson for DARE.

In the mid-1990s, from 1995 to 1996, Bledsoe hosted a daytime talk show, The Tempestt Bledsoe Show, produced by Columbia TriStar Television  and Dick Clark. She made a brief appearance in the sitcom The Parkers, and has been featured in the recurring role of a single mother on the ABC show The Practice. 

She also appeared in the Lifetime show Strong Medicine, and South of Nowhere. Her most recent credits include the role of Nina in the Oxygen Channel's original television movie Husband for Hire, Steven Bochco's Raising the Bar, and the role of Abby in the second season of Disney Channel's animated series The Replacements. She appeared on VH1's Celebrity Fit Club and NBC's Fear Factor.

It was announced on December 1, 2010 that Bledsoe would return to TV, replacing Niecy Nash as the host of Clean House on Style Network. Her first episode aired on January 26, 2011. In 2012, Bledsoe was heard as the voice of Sheriff Hooper in the Laika animated film ParaNorman.

From September 2012 to February 2013, she portrayed Marny in the NBC TV sitcom Guys with Kids.

In 2014, Bledsoe appeared in the Instant Mom episode "Not Your Mother's Day" in which she reprised her role as Vanessa Huxtable. In July 2019 Bledsoe appeared in the Netflix show Family Reunion episode 10 "Remember When Our Boys Became Men?".

Filmography

Personal life
Bledsoe earned a bachelor's degree in finance from New York University. Since 1993 she has been in a relationship with actor Darryl M. Bell, who co-starred in the NBC TV comedy A Different World, a spinoff of The Cosby Show. The couple appeared together in the Fox Reality Channel series Househusbands of Hollywood, which debuted August 2009. Bledsoe is a vegetarian.

References

External links

Actresses from Chicago
African-American television personalities
American television talk show hosts
Living people
20th-century American actresses
21st-century American actresses
Participants in American reality television series
African-American television talk show hosts
African-American actresses
American television actresses
American film actresses
American child actresses
African-American child actresses
New York University alumni
20th-century African-American women
20th-century African-American people
21st-century African-American women
21st-century African-American people
Year of birth missing (living people)